Daniel Baldacin (born 6 May 1977) is a Brazilian handball player. He competed in the men's tournament at the 2004 Summer Olympics.

References

External links
 

1977 births
Living people
Brazilian male handball players
Olympic handball players of Brazil
Handball players at the 2004 Summer Olympics
Handball players from São Paulo
Handball players at the 2003 Pan American Games
Pan American Games medalists in handball
Pan American Games gold medalists for Brazil
Medalists at the 2003 Pan American Games
21st-century Brazilian people